Damaspia (from Old Persian *Jāmāspi-  or *ðāmāspyā-) was a queen of Persia, wife of King Artaxerxes I, and mother of Xerxes II, his legitimate heir. She was Persian.

According to the Greek historian Ctesias of Cnidus, King Artaxerxes and his wife died the same day (424 BC, perhaps during a military expedition), and their corpses were carried to Persia. Xerxes succeeded his father, but was murdered not much later (423 BC) by his half-brother Sogdianus.

The epitome made by Photius of Ctesias' book is the only source that mentions Damaspia by name. Documents from Babylon dating in Artaxerxes' reign, refer to certain estates as "the house of the woman of the palace". This anonymous woman could be Damaspia, or the queen mother Amestris.

Notes

References

Brosius, M: Women in Ancient Persia, 559-331 BC, Clarendon Press, Oxford, 1998.
Schmitt, R: "Damaspia", in Encyclopaedia Iranica. 
Hinz, W: Altiranisches Sprachgut der Nebenüberlieferungen, Wiesbaden, 1975

5th-century BC women
Queens of the Achaemenid Empire
424 BC deaths
Year of birth unknown
5th-century BC Iranian people
Artaxerxes I